The Social Circle City School District is a public school district in Walton County, Georgia, United States, based in Social Circle. It serves the city of Social Circle and the surrounding communities of Walton County, including Jersey.

Schools
The Social Circle City School District has two elementary schools, one middle school, and one high school.

Elementary school
Social Circle Primary School
Social Circle Elementary School

Middle school
Social Circle Middle School

High school
Social Circle High School

References

External links

School districts in Georgia (U.S. state)
Education in Walton County, Georgia
Education in Newton County, Georgia